Cheraw Municipal Airport , also known as Lynch Bellinger Field, is a public use airport in Chesterfield County, South Carolina, United States. It is owned by the Town of Cheraw and located three nautical miles (6 km) northwest of its central business district.

Although most U.S. airports use the same three-letter location identifier for the FAA and IATA, this airport is assigned CQW by the FAA and HCW by the IATA.

Facilities and aircraft 
It has one runway designated 8/26 with an asphalt surface measuring 5,000 by 75 feet (1,524 x 23 m).

For the 12-month period ending May 1, 2008, the airport had 17,900 aircraft operations, an average of 49 per day: 99% general aviation and 1% military. At that time there were 18 aircraft based at this airport: 16 single-engine, 1 jet and 1 helicopter.

References

External links 
 Aerial photo as of 14 February 1994 from USGS The National Map
 

Airports in South Carolina
Buildings and structures in Chesterfield County, South Carolina
Transportation in Chesterfield County, South Carolina